Dirabius is a genus of flower weevils in the beetle family Curculionidae. There are about 11 described species in Dirabius.

Species
These 11 species belong to the genus Dirabius:
 Dirabius atromicans Casey, 1920
 Dirabius californicus Casey, 1920
 Dirabius calvus (LeConte, 1876)
 Dirabius inflaticollis Casey, 1920
 Dirabius mimus Casey, T.L., 1920
 Dirabius nimius Casey, 1920
 Dirabius promptus Casey, 1920
 Dirabius rectirostris (LeConte, 1876)
 Dirabius rotundicollis Casey, 1920
 Dirabius tentus Casey, 1920
 Dirabius tenua O'Brien & Wibmer, 1982

References

Further reading

 
 
 

Baridinae
Articles created by Qbugbot